Cafe Oto is a venue for free jazz, experimental and free improvisation performances located in the Dalston district of London, United Kingdom.

Founded in 2008 Cafe Oto (sound or noise in Japanese) is located in the heart of Dalston and provides a platform for experimental music ranging across all genres from folk, rock, noise and electronica covers. In 2012 it was noted by Vogue Italia as the 'coolest venue in London'. Occasionally artists take up brief residence across an entire week, such as Sun Ra Arkestra playing five nights in a row.

The venue is used to record live albums released under the cafe's OTOROKU label, among them Peter Brötzmann, John Butcher, Lol Coxhill, Phil Durrant, Fred Frith, Mats Gustafsson, Alexander Hawkins, Joe McPhee, Roscoe Mitchell, Thurston Moore, Paal Nilssen-Love, Steve Noble, Other Dimensions in Music, Han-Earl Park, Evan Parker, Eddie Prevost, Ivo Perelman, Matthew Shipp, Damo Suzuki and Ken Vandermark. Around the corner from the venue Cafe Oto maintains the Oto Project Space, utilised by aspiring artists and filmmakers to develop their craft through practice and workshop areas.

In May 2020, the venue launched a new in-house digital label TakuRoku featuring works created in response to the London lockdown and social distancing measures with 50% of the profits going directly to the artist, providing a way to help sustain both Cafe Oto and the artists involved.

References

Links 

Cafe Oto Homepage

Jazz clubs in London